The Global Warning Tour was the first Asian concert tour by South Korean boy band Big Bang. The tour began on March 28, 2008, in Tokyo, Japan and concluded on June 22, 2008, in Seoul, South Korea.

Set list

 "Intro"
 "Unknown Number"
 "Shake It"
 "Big Bang"
 "How Gee"
 "Big Boy" 
 "Prayer" 
 "Only Look at Me" 
 "A Fool of Tears"
 "Fool"
 Dance Preformace 
 "Crazy Dog" + "You in the Illusion" 
 "With U"
 "Dirty Cash" 
 "V.I.P"
 "La La La" 
 "Look at Me, Gwisun" 
 "This Love" 
 "But I Love U" 
 "We Belong Together" 
 "Lies" 
 "Last Farewell"
 "Always"

Tour dates

Notes

References

External links
Official Site
YG Entertainment

2008 concert tours
BigBang (South Korean band) concert tours
Concert tours of Asia
Concert tours of Japan